Swiss Book is the Swiss national bibliography. It is a bi-monthly publication of the Swiss National Library, available in print, in PDF format, and online.

Other names
 
 
 
 
 

It has previously been known as:
 1871-1877:  = . Zurigo: Schweizerisches Antiquariat
 1878-1900:  = . Basel ; Genève: H. Georg
 1901-1942:  = . Berna: Benteli

References

External links
 
 Online database
 PDF editions
 

Bi-monthly magazines published in Switzerland
Magazines published in Switzerland
Magazines established in 1871